El-Yam Kancepolsky (born 22 December 2003) is a professional footballer who plays as a midfielder for Israeli Premier League club Hapoel Tel Aviv. Born in the United States, he has represented Israel up to the under-19 level.

Early life
Kancepolsky was born in Hawaii, United States, to a family of well-known local Israeli swimmers of Ashkenazi Jewish descent who immigrated to Israel a couple of generations prior to his birth. He grew up in Herzliya, Israel.

Career statistics

Club

See also
List of Jewish footballers
List of Jews in sports
List of Israelis

References

2003 births
Living people
Israeli footballers
American Ashkenazi Jews
Footballers from Herzliya
Soccer players from Hawaii
Hapoel Tel Aviv F.C. players
Israeli Premier League players
Association football midfielders
Israel youth international footballers
American emigrants to Israel
Israeli Ashkenazi Jews
American people of Israeli descent
Israeli people of American-Jewish descent
Jewish footballers